The 14th European Maccabi Games (EMG2015) take place in Berlin from July 27 to August 5, 2015. The European Maccabiah Games take place in a four-year cycle, two years after the Maccabiah in Israel. Germany has been selected for the first time in its history as the venue. 2,300 athletes from 38 countries are participating, who will compete in 19 sports. The main venue for the Games was deliberately chosen the Olympic Park in Berlin. In this place, the Summer Olympics were held in 1936 during the era of Nazi Germany. At that time, Jews were discouraged from participating.

Sports
The matches will take place in the following 19 disciplines: Badminton, Basketball, Bridge, dressage, fencing, field hockey, football, futsal, golf, half-marathon, chess, swimming, squash, tennis, ten pin bowling, table tennis, triathlon, volleyball, water polo. The visit of the competitions is free for all spectators.

Football: Squads:Under 17:

Opening ceremony
The official opening ceremony of the largest Jewish sports event in Europe took place on July 28, 2015 held at the Waldbühne, where at the 1936 Olympics in Nazi Germany, the competitions were held in gymnastics. German President Joachim Gauck has assumed patronage of the 14th European Maccabi Games and held the opening speech. Never before a head of state has been the patron of a European Maccabiah. The opening ceremony was designed by the Israeli producer Ran Tzahor. The evening has been moderated by Palina Rojinski. The athletes of EMG2015 entered the Berlin Waldbühne. The traditional inflammation of the Maccabee-fire took place for the first time by a group of motorcyclists - in memory of the motorcyclists who wore 1931the message of the inaugural Maccabiah in the world  in a tour throughout Europe. Among others, the Arab-German singer Adel Tawil and the American-Jewish artist Matisyahu have been singing together.

References

2015 in multi-sport events
2015 in German sport
Sports competitions in Berlin
Maccabiah Games